The 1960 Boston Red Sox season was the 60th season in the franchise's Major League Baseball history. The Red Sox finished seventh in the American League (AL) with a record of 65 wins and 89 losses, 32 games behind the AL champion New York Yankees.

Regular season 
 June 7, 1960: Manager Billy Jurges was fired with Boston in eighth and last place. After interim skipper Del Baker handled the Bosox for seven games, Jurges was replaced by Mike "Pinky" Higgins (his predecessor) on June 14. 
 September 28, 1960: Ted Williams retired at the end of the Red Sox' home season. In his final at bat, Williams hit the 521st home run of his career. Williams finished the season with a .316 batting average at the age of 42. He did not play in Boston's three-game season finale at Yankee Stadium the ensuing weekend.
 September 28, 1960: The Red Sox also fired second-year general manager Bucky Harris after the club's final home game on September 28, and signed Higgins to a three-year contract as field manager and director of player personnel. Business manager Dick O'Connell was promoted to executive vice president, as the Red Sox temporarily abolished the title of general manager.

Season standings

Record vs. opponents

Notable transactions 
 March 16, 1960: Sammy White and Jim Marshall were traded by the Red Sox to the Cleveland Indians for Russ Nixon. White refused to report and went on the voluntarily retired list, cancelling the trade with the players returning to their original clubs.
 May 6, 1960: Nelson Chittum was traded by the Red Sox to the Los Angeles Dodgers for Rip Repulski.
 May 17, 1960: Ron Jackson was traded by the Red Sox to the Milwaukee Braves for Ray Boone.
 June 13, 1960: Marty Keough and Ted Bowsfield were traded by the Red Sox to the Cleveland Indians for Russ Nixon and Carroll Hardy. The trade marked the second time in three months that Boston had obtained Nixon (see March 16, above).
 September 14, 1960: Ray Boone was released by the Red Sox.

Opening Day lineup

Roster

Player stats

Batting

Starters by position 
Note: Pos = Position; G = Games played; AB = At bats; H = Hits; Avg. = Batting average; HR = Home runs; RBI = Runs batted in

Other batters 
Note: G = Games played; AB = At bats; H = Hits; Avg. = Batting average; HR = Home runs; RBI = Runs batted in

Pitching

Starting pitchers 
Note: G = Games pitched; IP = Innings pitched; W = Wins; L = Losses; ERA = Earned run average; SO = Strikeouts

Other pitchers 
Note: G = Games pitched; IP = Innings pitched; W = Wins; L = Losses; ERA = Earned run average; SO = Strikeouts

Relief pitchers 
Note: G = Games pitched; W = Wins; L = Losses; SV = Saves; ERA = Earned run average; SO = Strikeouts

Farm system 

LEAGUE CHAMPIONS: Waterloo

Source:

References

External links
1960 Boston Red Sox team page at Baseball Reference
1960 Boston Red Sox season at baseball-almanac.com

Boston Red Sox seasons
Boston Red Sox
Boston Red Sox
1960s in Boston